"A Rose Is Still a Rose" is a song recorded by American singer Aretha Franklin. It was written and produced by singer Lauryn Hill for Franklin's album of the same name (1998). The song focused on a motherly figure giving advice to a younger woman who keeps getting into bad relationships. Throughout "A Rose Is Still a Rose", Franklin advises that in spite of everything and despite the woman's "scorned roses and thorn crowns," the woman is "still a rose". Elements of the song "What I Am" by Edie Brickell and the New Bohemians were sung throughout the song by Hill herself.

Released as the album's lead single in 1998, the song became a surprise hit for Franklin, 40-plus years into her career, reaching number 26 on the Billboard Hot 100 and number-five on the Hot R&B/Hip-Hop Songs chart, while also reaching the UK top 40. "A Rose Is Still a Rose" remains one of Franklin's most played songs from her later years and was her last top 40 hit. The single received nominations for Best Female R&B Vocal Performance and Best R&B Song at the 41st Annual Grammy Awards.

Critical reception
Larry Flick from Billboard described the song as "a sleek, jeep-styled cruiser that matches her with Lauryn Hill of the Fugees," noting that "it's an absolutely electric union that results in Franklin's strongest, most instantly pop-viable single in eons. Hills dresses the track in fashionable shuffle-funk beats, a snaky bassline, and jiggly wah-wah guitars, leaving the legendary singer plenty of room to flex and vamp to maximum effect." He also added that "kids will dig the contemporary vibe of the track (and, it is hoped, use this single as a springboard into a deeper exploration of Franklin's plush catalog), while more mature listeners will bond with the sage, almost motherly tone of the lyrics. A li'l something for everyone." 

Jeremy Helligar from Entertainment Weekly said that "A Rose Is Still a Rose" "doesn't match the soulful finesse of "Spanish Harlem", but when Lady Soul sings about a rose, something divine happens." He added, "Even after a dozen listens, the song's it's-his-problem-not-yours message doesn't lose its bloom." After the passing of Franklin in 2018, Alexis Petridis from The Guardian wrote, "The late 90s attempt to give Franklin a hip-hop/neo soul-influenced makeover didn’t really work, except on the album’s Lauryn Hill-penned title track. The beat and the lyrical references to “flossin’” are contemporary, but the singer sounds unfazed, delivering a coolly controlled performance." A reviewer from People Magazine picked it as "the best" song of the album.

Music video
An accompanying music video was produced to promote the single, directed by Lauryn Hill and designed by Ron Norsworthy. It features Franklin, Hill and other female R&B singers such as Faith Evans, Changing Faces, Amel Larrieux and actress Elise Neal as protagonists along with A Tribe Called Quest rapper, Q-Tip.

Track listings

U.S. CD single
"A Rose Is Still a Rose" - 3:56
"Snippets from the album 'A Rose Is Still a Rose'" - 5:30

U.S. promo single 
"A Rose Is Still a Rose (without intro)" - 3:56
"A Rose Is Still a Rose (with intro)" -4:25

U.S. maxi single
"A Rose Is Still a Rose (Love to Infinity Rhythm Radio Mix)" - 3:58
"A Rose Is Still a Rose (Hex Hector Club Mix)" - 8:55 
"A Rose Is Still a Rose (Love to Infinity Club Mix)" - 6:56
"A Rose Is Still a Rose (Album Version)" - 4:27
"A Rose Is Still a Rose (Instrumental)" - 4:27

UK CD 1
"A Rose Is Still a Rose (Original Radio Edit)" - 3:56
"A Rose Is Still a Rose (Desert Eagles Discs Remix)" - 4:51
"A Rose Is Still a Rose (London Connection Hierachal Mix)" - 7:42
"A Rose Is Still a Rose (London Connection's Cookin' Dub)" - 6:26
"A Rose Is Still a Rose (Instrumental)" - 4:27

UK CD 2 
"A Rose Is Still a Rose (Original Radio Edit)" - 3:56
"A Rose Is Still a Rose (Love to Infinity Rhythm Radio Mix)" - 3:58
"A Rose Is Still a Rose (Love to Infinity Kick Mix)" - 7:10
"A Rose Is Still a Rose (Johnny Vicious Club Mix)" - 10:47
"A Rose Is Still a Rose (Hex Hector Club Mix)" - 8:55 

Hip Hop Mixes promo CD single 
"A Rose Is Still a Rose (Yogi's Bystorm Remix)" - 4:03
"A Rose Is Still a Rose (Desert Eagle Remix)" - 4:26

Hip Hop Mixes promo 12" single 
"A Rose Is Still a Rose (Yogi's Bystorm Remix)" - 4:03
"A Rose Is Still a Rose (Yogi's Bystorm Remix) [Instrumental]" - 4:51
"A Rose Is Still a Rose (Yogi's Bystorm Remix) [Acappella]" - 4:40
"A Rose Is Still a Rose (Desert Eagle Remix)" - 4:26
"A Rose Is Still a Rose (Desert Eagle Remix) [Instrumental]" - 4:27
"A Rose Is Still a Rose (Original Radio Edit)" - 4:00

The Remixes" (2x12" vinyls) 
"A Rose Is Still a Rose (Hex Hector Club Mix)" - 8:55 
"A Rose Is Still a Rose (Album Version)" - 4:29
"A Rose Is Still a Rose (Johnny Vicious Dub)" - 9:28
"A Rose Is Still a Rose (Love to Infinity Kick Mix)" - 7:11
"A Rose Is Still a Rose (Johnny Vicious Club Mix)" - 10:44
"A Rose Is Still a Rose (Hex Hector Drums)" - 3:50
"A Rose Is Still a Rose (Love to Infinity Club Mix)" - 6:56
"A Rose Is Still a Rose (Love to Infinity Rhythm Radio Mix)" - 3:58
"A Rose Is Still a Rose (Album Version) [Instrumental]" - 5:25

Credits and personnel 
Credits adapted from the liner notes of A Rose Is Still a Rose.
Performance

Lead vocals: Aretha Franklin
Background vocals: Lauryn Hill, Aretha Franklin
Piano: James Poyser

Guitar: Johari Newton
Bass guitar: Vere Isaac
Strings: Indigo Quartet

Production 

Produced and arranged by Lauryn Hill
Strings arranged by Akua Dixon
Music programmed by Vada Nobles

Recording engineer: Warren Riker
Recording and mixing engineer: Commissioner Gordon
Audio mixing assisted by: Alex Olsson

Charts and certifications

Weekly charts

Year-end charts

Certifications

|}

References

1998 singles
Aretha Franklin songs
Songs written by Lauryn Hill
1998 songs
Arista Records singles
Hip hop soul songs
Songs with feminist themes